James Archibald McLarnin (19 December 1907 – 28 October 2004) was an Irish professional boxer who became a two-time welterweight world champion and an International Boxing Hall of Fame inductee.

McLarnin has been referred to as the greatest Irish boxer of all time. BoxRec ranks McLarnin as the second-best pound-for-pound fighter of all-time, the greatest Irish boxer of all time.

Background
There was often confusion over McLarnin's exact place of birth and his date of birth. McLarnin himself was unsure as to the exact location and at various times claimed to be born in Inchicore, Dublin, in modern-day Ireland, or the Lisburn Road in Belfast, Ireland, modern day Northern Ireland. Adding to the confusion he went by nicknames the Dublin Destroyer and Belfast Spider. It was Irish boxing historian Patrick Myler who later unearthed McLarnin's birth certificate which showed that McLarnin was born in Hillsborough, County Down, Ireland in 1907.

McLarnin's father, Sam McLarnin, a Methodist from Dublin, was described as 'a typical Dublin Irishman' and traveled throughout Britain and Ireland for work as a butcher. He later married Mary Ferris from Belfast and they settled in County Down before being drawn into Belfast. When McLarnin was three years of age the whole family emigrated to Saskatchewan, Canada via Liverpool. The McLarnins started out as a wheat farmers, but years later, at the age of 10 and following a particularly harsh winter, the family moved to Vancouver where they opened a second-hand clothes store in Vancouver's east end.

McLarnin was a prodigious athlete, his main sports were football, baseball and boxing and was considered a model of propriety by Rev. A.E. Roberts at the Methodist mission in Vancouver. He took up boxing at the age of 10 after getting into a fight defending his newspaper-selling pitch. Former professional boxer Charles "Pop" Foster recognized McLarnin's talent at the age of 13. He constructed a makeshift gym for McLarnin to train in, sure that he would one day be the champion of the world. The two of them would remain close, and when Foster died, he left everything he had to McLarnin.

Boxing career
Following a successful start to his career in Vancouver, McLarnin's grew aggrieved at the low pay he was receiving for bouts and decided to move south. "We had to go to the United States to make our money. We owe Vancouver nothing" said McLarnin.

Foster took McLarnin to San Francisco, where his youthful appearance made it difficult to get a fight until he lied about his age. It is for this reason that McLarnin was known as the "Baby-faced Assassin". Despite his youthful appearance, McLarnin had incredible power with both fists, his right being particularly feared. However, like many similar fighters McLarnin suffered several hand injuries throughout his career.  Towards the end of his career McLarnin was forced to become more of a scientific boxer to reduce further injuries to his hands.

McLarnin lost his first title shot on 21 May 1928 in New York against world lightweight champion Sammy Mandell. However, he did go on to beat him twice in the following two years. It would be five years before McLarnin would next get a title shot, during which time he knocked out gifted Jewish fighters Al Singer, Ruby Goldstein, and Sid Terris.

McLarnin's second title shot came against welterweight champion Young Corbett III. McLarnin won by knockout after only 2 minutes 37 seconds. Following his title success, McLarnin fought an epic three-fight series with Barney Ross. The first fight, on 28 May 1934, was won by Ross, but McLarnin regained his title in their next match four months later. In the deciding fight on 28 May 1935, McLarnin lost his title for the final time in a narrow decision.

McLarnin retired in November 1936 still at the top of his game, having won his last two fights against all-time greats Tony Canzoneri and Lou Ambers. His record was 54 wins, 11 losses, and 3 draws in 68 contests. In 1996 Ring Magazine voted McLarnin the fifth-greatest welterweight of all time.

Life after boxing
McLarnin never returned to the ring despite large incentives for him to do so. Unlike many boxers, McLarnin invested his money wisely and retired a wealthy man. He opened an electrical goods store, and also did some acting, golfing, and lecturing.

In 1937, he appeared with boxers Maxie Rosenbloom, James J. Jeffries, Jack Dempsey, and Jackie Fields, in MGM's Big City, a film involving rough competition between two rival taxi companies.

In 1938, he appeared in a background gymnasium scene for the successful 1938, MGM boxing movie, The Crowd Roars with boxers Abe "The Newsboy" Hollandersky, Joe Glick, Maxie Rosenbloom, Jack Roper, and Tommy Herman.

In 1946, he appeared in Monogram Pictures' boxing movie, Joe Palooka, Champ, with cameos by real boxing greats Joe Louis, Henry Armstrong, Ceferino Garcia, and Manuel Ortiz. Heavyweight Jack Roper appeared as the character Waldo. The simple plot involved young boxer Joe and his girl resisting mob influence while Joe trains to fight the champ.

Death
McLarnin died on 28 October 2004 at the age of 96 in Richland, Washington. He was interred in the Forest Lawn Memorial Park Cemetery in Glendale, California.

Professional boxing record

{|class="wikitable" style="text-align:center"
|-
!
!Result
!Record
!Opponent
!Type
!Round
!Date
!Age
!Location
!Notes
|-
|69
|Win
|55–11–3
|align=left| Lou Ambers
|UD
|10
|Nov 20, 1936
|style="text-align:left;"|
|align=left|
|align=left|
|- align=center
|68
|Win
|54–11–3
|align=left| Tony Canzoneri
|UD
|10
|Oct 5, 1936
|style="text-align:left;"|
|align=left|
|align=left|
|- align=center
|67
|Loss
|53–11–3
|align=left| Tony Canzoneri
|UD
|10
|May 8, 1936
|style="text-align:left;"|
|align=left|
|align=left|
|- align=center
|66
|Loss
|53–10–3
|align=left| Barney Ross
|UD
|15
|May 28, 1935
|style="text-align:left;"|
|align=left|
|align=left|
|- align=center
|65
|Win
|53–9–3
|align=left| Barney Ross
|SD
|15
|Sep 17, 1934
|style="text-align:left;"|
|align=left|
|align=left|
|- align=center
|64
|Loss
|52–9–3
|align=left| Barney Ross
|SD
|15
|May 28, 1934
|style="text-align:left;"|
|align=left|
|align=left|
|- align=center
|63
|Win
|52–8–3
|align=left| Young Corbett III
|TKO
|1 (10)
|May 29, 1933
|style="text-align:left;"|
|align=left|
|align=left|
|- align=center
|62
|Win
|51–8–3
|align=left| Sammy Fuller
|TKO
|8 (10)
|Dec 16, 1932
|style="text-align:left;"|
|align=left|
|align=left|
|- align=center
|61
|Win
|50–8–3
|align=left| Benny Leonard
|TKO
|6 (10)
|Oct 7, 1932
|style="text-align:left;"|
|align=left|
|align=left|
|- align=center
|60
|Loss
|49–8–3
|align=left| Lou Brouillard
|SD
|10
|Aug 4, 1932
|style="text-align:left;"|
|align=left|
|align=left|
|- align=center
|59
|Win
|49–7–3
|align=left| Billy Petrolle
|UD
|10
|Aug 20, 1931
|style="text-align:left;"|
|align=left|
|align=left|
|- align=center
|58
|Win
|48–7–3
|align=left| Billy Petrolle
|UD
|10
|May 27, 1931
|style="text-align:left;"|
|align=left|
|align=left|
|- align=center
|57
|Loss
|47–7–3
|align=left| Billy Petrolle
|UD
|10
|Nov 21, 1930
|style="text-align:left;"|
|align=left|
|align=left|
|- align=center
|56
|Win
|47–6–3
|align=left| Al Singer
|KO
|3 (10)
|Sep 11, 1930
|style="text-align:left;"|
|align=left|
|align=left|
|- align=center
|55
|Win
|46–6–3
|align=left| Jack Thompson
|UD
|10
|Mar 28, 1930
|style="text-align:left;"|
|align=left|
|- align=center
|54
|Win
|45–6–3
|align=left| Sammy Mandell
|UD
|10
|Mar 1, 1930
|style="text-align:left;"|
|align=left|
|align=left|
|- align=center
|53
|Win
|44–6–3
|align=left| Ruby Goldstein
|KO
|2 (10)
|Dec 13, 1929
|style="text-align:left;"|
|align=left|
|align=left|
|- align=center
|52
|Win
|43–6–3
|align=left| Sammy Mandell
|UD
|10
|Nov 4, 1929
|style="text-align:left;"|
|align=left|
|align=left|
|- align=center
|51
|Win
|42–6–3
|align=left| Sergeant Sammy Baker
|KO
|1 (10)
|Oct 9, 1929
|style="text-align:left;"|
|align=left|
|align=left|
|- align=center
|50
|Win
|41–6–3
|align=left| Ray Miller
|UD
|10
|Mar 22, 1929
|style="text-align:left;"|
|align=left|
|align=left|
|- align=center
|49
|Win
|40–6–3
|align=left| Joe Glick
|KO
|2 (10)
|Mar 1, 1929
|style="text-align:left;"|
|align=left|
|align=left|
|- align=center
|48
|Win
|39–6–3
|align=left| Joe Glick
|UD
|10
|Jan 11, 1929
|style="text-align:left;"|
|align=left|
|align=left|
|- align=center
|47
|Loss
|38–6–3
|align=left| Ray Miller
|RTD
|7 (10)
|Nov 30, 1928
|style="text-align:left;"|
|align=left|
|align=left|
|- align=center
|46
|Win
|38–5–3
|align=left| Stanislaus Loayza
|KO
|4 (10)
|Aug 2, 1928
|style="text-align:left;"|
|align=left|
|align=left|
|- align=center
|45
|Win
|37–5–3
|align=left| Phil McGraw
|TKO
|1 (10)
|Jun 21, 1928
|style="text-align:left;"|
|align=left|
|align=left|
|- align=center
|44
|Loss
|36–5–3
|align=left| Sammy Mandell
|UD
|15
|May 21, 1928
|style="text-align:left;"|
|align=left|
|style="text-align:left;"|
|- align=center
|43
|Win
|36–4–3
|align=left| Sid Terris
|KO
|1 (10)
|Feb 24, 1928
|style="text-align:left;"|
|align=left|
|align=left|
|- align=center
|42
|Win
|35–4–3
|align=left| Billy Wallace
|PTS
|10
|Nov 23, 1927
|style="text-align:left;"|
|align=left|
|align=left|
|- align=center
|41
|Win
|34–4–3
|align=left| Louis Kaplan
|KO
|8 (10)
|Oct 18, 1927
|style="text-align:left;"|
|align=left|
|align=left|
|- align=center
|40
|Win
|33–4–3
|align=left| Don Long
|KO
|3 (10)
|Sep 23, 1927
|style="text-align:left;"|
|align=left|
|align=left|
|- align=center
|39
|Win
|32–4–3
|align=left| Charlie McBride
|KO
|2 (10)
|Sep 9, 1927
|style="text-align:left;"|
|align=left|
|align=left|
|- align=center
|38
|Win
|31–4–3
|align=left| Lope Tenorio
|PTS
|10
|Jun 24, 1927
|style="text-align:left;"|
|align=left|
|align=left|
|- align=center
|37
|Win
|30–4–3
|align=left| Johnny Lamar
|PTS
|10
|May 27, 1927
|style="text-align:left;"|
|align=left|
|align=left|
|- align=center
|36
|Win
|29–4–3
|align=left| Freeman Black
|KO
|2 (10)
|May 6, 1927
|style="text-align:left;"|
|align=left|
|align=left|
|- align=center
|35
|Win
|28–4–3
|align=left| Tommy Cello
|PTS
|10
|Apr 5, 1927
|style="text-align:left;"|
|align=left|
|align=left|
|- align=center
|34
|Draw
|27–4–3
|align=left| Tommy Cello
|PTS
|10
|Feb 22, 1927
|style="text-align:left;"|
|align=left|
|
|- align=center
|33
|Loss
|27–4–2
|align=left| Doc Snell
|PTS
|10
|Oct 15, 1926
|style="text-align:left;"|
|align=left|
|align=left|
|- align=center
|32
|Win
|27–3–2
|align=left| Joe Glick
|PTS
|10
|Sep 7, 1926
|style="text-align:left;"|
|align=left|
|align=left|
|- align=center
|31
|Loss
|26–3–2
|align=left| Johnny Farr
|PTS
|10
|Mar 17, 1926
|style="text-align:left;"|
|align=left|
|align=left|
|- align=center
|30
|Win
|26–2–2
|align=left| Joey Sangor
|KO
|3 (10)
|Mar 3, 1926
|style="text-align:left;"|
|align=left|
|align=left|
|- align=center
|29
|Loss
|25–2–2
|align=left| Bud Taylor
|PTS
|10
|Jan 12, 1926
|style="text-align:left;"|
|align=left|
|align=left|
|- align=center
|28
|Win
|25–1–2
|align=left| Bud Taylor
|DQ
|2 (10)
|Dec 8, 1925
|style="text-align:left;"|
|align=left|
|align=left|
|- align=center
|27
|Win
|24–1–2
|align=left| Jackie Fields
|KO
|2 (10)
|Nov 12, 1925
|style="text-align:left;"|
|align=left|
|align=left|
|- align=center
|26
|Win
|23–1–2
|align=left| Pancho Villa
|PTS
|10
|Jul 4, 1925
|style="text-align:left;"|
|align=left|
|
|- align=center
|25
|Loss
|22–1–2
|align=left| Bud Taylor
|PTS
|10
|Jun 2, 1925
|style="text-align:left;"|
|align=left|
|align=left|
|- align=center
|24
|Win
|22–0–2
|align=left| Eddie Spec Ramies
|KO
|6 (6)
|Apr 18, 1925
|style="text-align:left;"|
|align=left|
|align=left|
|- align=center
|23
|Win
|21–0–2
|align=left| Young Farrell
|PTS
|6
|Apr 11, 1925
|style="text-align:left;"|
|align=left|
|align=left|
|- align=center
|22
|Win
|20–0–2
|align=left| Teddy Silva
|PTS
|10
|Mar 24, 1925
|style="text-align:left;"|
|align=left|
|align=left|
|- align=center
|21
|Win
|19–0–2
|align=left| Fidel LaBarba
|PTS
|10
|Jan 13, 1925
|style="text-align:left;"|
|align=left|
|align=left|
|- align=center
|20
|Draw
|18–0–2
|align=left| Memphis Pal Moore
|PTS
|4
|Dec 9, 1924
|style="text-align:left;"|
|align=left|
|align=left|
|- align=center
|19
|Draw
|18–0–1
|align=left| Fidel LaBarba
|PTS
|4
|Nov 11, 1924
|style="text-align:left;"|
|align=left|
|align=left|
|- align=center
|18
|Win
|18–0
|align=left| Fidel LaBarba
|PTS
|4
|Oct 28, 1924
|style="text-align:left;"|
|align=left|
|align=left|
|- align=center
|17
|Win
|17–0
|align=left| Young Nationalista
|PTS
|4
|Oct 14, 1924
|style="text-align:left;"|
|align=left|
|align=left|
|- align=center
|16
|Win
|16–0
|align=left| Frankie Dolan
|PTS
|4
|Oct 7, 1924
|style="text-align:left;"|
|align=left|
|align=left|
|- align=center
|15
|Win
|15–0
|align=left| Benny Diaz
|PTS
|4
|Sep 30, 1924
|style="text-align:left;"|
|align=left|
|align=left|
|- align=center
|14
|Win
|14–0
|align=left| Mickey Gill
|MD
|10
|Aug 15, 1924
|style="text-align:left;"|
|align=left|
|align=left|
|- align=center
|13
|Win
|13–0
|align=left| Abe Gordon
|KO
|2 (4)
|May 14, 1924
|style="text-align:left;"|
|align=left|
|align=left|
|- align=center
|12
|Win
|12–0
|align=left| Jimmy Griffiths
|PTS
|4
|May 2, 1924
|style="text-align:left;"|
|align=left|
|align=left|
|- align=center
|11
|Win
|11–0
|align=left| Jockey Joe Dillon
|PTS
|4
|Apr 30, 1924
|style="text-align:left;"|
|align=left|
|align=left|
|- align=center
|10
|Win
|10–0
|align=left| Johnny Jockey Lightner
|PTS
|4
|Apr 24, 1924
|style="text-align:left;"|
|align=left|
|align=left|
|- align=center
|9
|Win
|9–0
|align=left| Frankie Grandetta
|PTS
|4
|Apr 9, 1924
|style="text-align:left;"|
|align=left|
|align=left|
|- align=center
|8
|Win
|8–0
|align=left| Jimmy Griffiths
|PTS
|4
|Apr 4, 1924
|style="text-align:left;"|
|align=left|
|align=left|
|- align=center
|7
|Win
|7–0
|align=left| Sammy Lee
|PTS
|4
|Mar 26, 1924
|style="text-align:left;"|
|align=left|
|align=left|
|- align=center
|6
|Win
|6–0
|align=left| Frankie Sands
|PTS
|4
|Mar 19, 1924
|style="text-align:left;"|
|align=left|
|align=left|
|- align=center
|5
|Win
|5–0
|align=left| Joe Conde
|TKO
|3 (4)
|Mar 5, 1924
|style="text-align:left;"|
|align=left|
|align=left|
|- align=center
|4
|Win
|4–0
|align=left| Eddie Collins
|TKO
|3 (4)
|Feb 22, 1924
|style="text-align:left;"|
|align=left|
|align=left|
|- align=center
|3
|Win
|3–0
|align=left| Frankie Sands
|PTS
|4
|Feb 13, 1924
|style="text-align:left;"|
|align=left|
|align=left|
|- align=center
|2
|Win
|2–0
|align=left| Mickey Gill
|MD
|7
|Dec 28, 1923
|style="text-align:left;"|
|align=left|
|align=left|
|- align=center
|1
|Win
|1–0
|align=left| Young Fry
|KO
|1 (6)
|Dec 19, 1923
|style="text-align:left;"|
|align=left|
|align=left|

See also
List of welterweight boxing champions

Notes

References

External links

|-

|-

 https://boxrec.com/media/index.php/The_Ring_Magazine%27s_Annual_Ratings:_Welterweight--1930s
 https://boxrec.com/media/index.php/National_Boxing_Association%27s_Quarterly_Ratings:_1933
 https://titlehistories.com/boxing/na/usa/ny/nysac-wl.html

1907 births
2004 deaths
Boxers from Belfast
Male boxers from Northern Ireland
Irish male boxers
People from Richland, Washington
Canadian male boxers
Irish emigrants to Canada
People from Hillsborough, County Down
Sportspeople from Vancouver
Welterweight boxers
International Boxing Hall of Fame inductees
Burials at Forest Lawn Memorial Park (Glendale)
Canadian people of Ulster-Scottish descent